Esala Ruwan Weerakoon is a Sri Lankan diplomat who is the current SAARC Secretary General, in office since March 2020. He served as permanent secretary to the Ministry of Tourism Development and permanent secretary of the  Ministry of Foreign Affairs and as Sri Lankan High Commissioner to India and ambassador to Norway.

Early life

Born to a civil servant Bradman Weerakoon and Damayanthi Gunasekara, he was educated at Royal College, Colombo. He studied economics at the University of Kelaniya and undertook post-graduate studies at London School of Economics.

Career

Joining the Sri Lanka Foreign Service in 1988, he served in several foreign postings in London, Canberra, Kuala Lumpur and Paris. He served as Charge d'affairs at Sri Lankan Embassies in Washington DC and in Tokyo. During his tenure of service at the Ministry of Foreign Affairs, he has served in different capacities including as the Director General of Economic Affairs Division and the Director General of East Asia & Pacific Division. He has also held office as Additional Secretary (External Relations) at the Ministry of Economic Development and as Additional Secretary (Special Projects) at the Ministry of Housing & Samurdhi. He has served as Ambassador to Norway, High Commissioner to Seychelles and was appointed as High Commissioner of Sri Lanka to India in November 2015.

References

Living people
Ambassadors of Sri Lanka to Norway
High Commissioners of Sri Lanka to India
Sinhalese civil servants
Sri Lankan diplomats
Alumni of Royal College, Colombo
Alumni of the University of Kelaniya
Alumni of the London School of Economics
Year of birth missing (living people)
Secretaries General of the South Asian Association for Regional Cooperation